Bay Ridge Line refers to the following transit lines:
Bay Ridge Branch (Long Island Rail Road freight)
Bay Ridge Line (surface) (bus, formerly streetcar), see Fifth Avenue Line (Brooklyn elevated)